Ending on a High Note: The Final Concert is a live album by Norwegian band a-ha, released on 1 April 2011. It was recorded at the Oslo Spektrum in Oslo on 4 December 2010, which was initially planned to be their final concert before their eventual reunion in 2015. The concert on the previous night was also recorded as a back-up. The album contains the entire set from the final concert with the exception of "The Bandstand" and "Bowling Green", the latter being an Everly Brothers cover the band performed as part of the final encore.

There were separate CD, DVD, deluxe DVD (two CDs and DVD) and Blu-ray editions. The CD-only release is a one-disc CD and only features 16 tracks.

Track listing
"The Sun Always Shines on T.V." (Paul Waaktaar-Savoy)
"Move to Memphis" (Magne Furuholmen, Paul Waaktaar-Savoy)†
"The Blood That Moves the Body" (Paul Waaktaar-Savoy)
"Scoundrel Days" (Magne Furuholmen, Paul Waaktaar-Savoy)
"The Swing of Things" (Paul Waaktaar-Savoy)
"Forever Not Yours" (Magne Furuholmen, Morten Harket, Ole Sverre-Olsen)
"Stay on These Roads" (Magne Furuholmen, Morten Harket, Paul Waaktaar-Savoy)
"Manhattan Skyline" (Magne Furuholmen, Paul Waaktaar-Savoy)
"Hunting High and Low" (Paul Waaktaar-Savoy) 
"We're Looking for the Whales" (Paul Waaktaar-Savoy)†
"Butterfly, Butterfly (The Last Hurrah)" (Paul Waaktaar-Savoy)†
"Crying in the Rain" (Carole King, Howard Greenfield)†
"Minor Earth Major Sky" (Magne Furuholmen, Paul Waaktaar-Savoy)
"Summer Moved On" (Paul Waaktaar-Savoy)
"I've Been Losing You" (Paul Waaktaar-Savoy)
"Foot of the Mountain" (Magne Furuholmen, Paul Waaktaar-Savoy, Martin Terefe)
"Cry Wolf" (Magne Furuholmen, Paul Waaktaar-Savoy)
"Analogue (All I Want)" (Magne Furuholmen, Max Martin, Paul Waaktaar-Savoy)
"The Living Daylights" (John Barry, Paul Waaktaar-Savoy)
"Take On Me" (Magne Furuholmen, Morten Harket, Paul Waaktaar-Savoy)

† Not included on single-disc edition.

Personnel
Credits adapted from the liner notes of Ending on a High Note: The Final Concert.

A-ha
 Morten Harket
 Magne Furuholmen
 Paul Waaktaar-Savoy

Additional personnel
 Karl Oluf Wennerberg – drums
 Erik Ljunggren – keyboards, bass
 Jan Inge Berentsen Anvik – additional programming
 Toby Alington – recording, mixing
 Stian Andersen – photos
 Martin Kvamme – cover design

Charts

Weekly charts

Year-end charts

Certifications

References

2011 live albums
2011 video albums
A-ha albums
Live video albums
Universal Music Group live albums